Wenji Gefersa a town in central Ethiopia.

Overview
Local landmarks include the Wenji Ye'itkilt Wana Mesreya church and the Wonji Sugar Plantation, which covers about 7050 hectares of land. A paper mill was opened in Wenji Gefersa in 1970. 

In the latter part of August 1968, approximately 2,000-4,000 workers from the plantation marched to Addis Ababa in a labor protest; they were met by military fire and several workers were killed.

Demographics
Based on figures from the Central Statistical Agency in 2005, Wenji Gefersa has an estimated total population of 23,510 of whom 11,456 were males and 12,054 were females. The 1994 national census reported this town had a total population of 13,156 of whom 6,213 were males and 6,943 were females. This was a dramatic decrease from the 38,408 recorded in 1987. It is one of five settlements in Nannawa Adama.

Notes

Populated places in the Oromia Region